Ravlić is a Croatian surname. Notable people with the surname include:

 Ljiljana Ravlić (born 1958), Western Australian politician of Croatian origin
 Slaven Ravlić (born 1951), Croatian lexicographer and politologist

Croatian surnames